Álvaro Muñoz Borchers (born November 25, 1990) is a Spanish professional basketball player for Obradoiro of the Liga ACB.

References

1990 births
Living people
Baloncesto Fuenlabrada players
Bàsquet Manresa players
Obradoiro CAB players
People from Ávila, Spain
Sportspeople from the Province of Ávila
Small forwards
Spanish men's basketball players